Daniel Huss (born 4 October 1979) is a Luxembourgian footballer who played as a striker for CS Grevenmacher in Luxembourg's domestic National Division until 2014.

Club career
Huss came through the youth ranks at local side CS Grevenmacher and joined Belgians Standard Liège at 17 years of age only to leave them for the reserves of FC Kaiserslautern after only half a season. He rejoined Grevenmacher the next season to start a longer-lasting and prolific career with them. He was club captain when he won their first ever league title with Grevenmacher in 2003 and made it a league and cup double by scoring the winning goal in the 1-0 cup final defeat of Etzella Ettelbruck. Also, he became the league's top goalscorer that year by scoring 22 goals.

He also scored a goal in the 2008 cup final, a 4–1 defeat of Victoria Rosport.

International career
Huss made his debut for Luxembourg in a February 2000 friendly match against Northern Ireland, coming on as a late substitute for Luc Holtz. He went on to earn 46 caps, scoring 2 goals. He played in 12 World Cup qualification matches.

Honours
CS Grevenmacher
 Luxembourg National Division: 2003
 Luxembourg Cup: 2003, 2008

References

External links
 
 

1979 births
Living people
Luxembourgian footballers
1. FC Kaiserslautern II players
Standard Liège players
CS Grevenmacher players
Expatriate footballers in Germany
Luxembourg international footballers
Association football forwards